There's No Taste Like Home is a British daytime cookery show that was part of the ITV Food category on ITV in 2011.

External links

2011 British television series debuts
2011 British television series endings
English-language television shows
ITV game shows
Television series by ITV Studios